Juan Carlos Leiva (born 22 May 1933) is a Uruguayan footballer. He played in two matches for the Uruguay national football team in 1959. He was also part of Uruguay's squad for the 1959 South American Championship that took place in Argentina.

References

External links
 

1933 births
Living people
Uruguayan footballers
Uruguay international footballers
Place of birth missing (living people)
Association football goalkeepers
Club Nacional de Football players
Rampla Juniors players
Club Atlético Independiente footballers
Uruguayan expatriate footballers
Expatriate footballers in Argentina